The Uribante River is a river of Venezuela, a tributary of the Apure River. 

The river is in the Orinoco basin.
It drains part of the southern slope of the Táchira depression.

See also
List of rivers of Venezuela

References

Sources

Rivers of Venezuela